Wesley is a village in north-eastern Dominica, situated between the old estates of Eden and Londonderry. Like many other villages along the east coast Wesley developed after Emancipation on hilly land along the boundary between the two estates as labourers sought to establish independent holdings for themselves away from the plantations where they had formerly lived and worked. In the mid 19th century, Charles Leatham, owner of Eden, sold several small lots in this area. His estates had been centres for early evangelization by Wesleyan missionaries and by as early as 1837 religious and night school gatherings were being held in a large estate building on Londonderry estate. Methodist influence grew further when free labourers were introduced into the estates of the north-east from Antigua, Montserrat, and other Leeward Islands to replant the sugar estates in cocoa and limes. By the 1860s the settlement was referred to as Wesleyville and was dominated by a woman shopkeeper called Ma Wesley. Eventually the place was simply called Wesley, while the district continued to be called by its old French parish name, La Soie (La Swa). At the end of the 19th century the Roman Catholic Church began to make a move to evangelize the area, but so strong was the Protestant influence that it had to buy land for the first church by using one of its faithful to purchase the land in his name and then to declare it for the church after the sale was completed. Tensions between the two faiths were high for a time. In the 1940s and 1950s large-scale land settlement schemes in the interior organized by the British government enabled villagers to buy Crown Lands and free themselves of dependency on the estates. This coincided with the beginning of the banana boom and Wesley benefited materially from this development. Economic growth enabled villagers to improve their housing and send children to secondary schools in Roseau. In 1979 the opening of St.Andrew's High School provided such education closer to home. National political changes also had an effect on the general changes in the community. 

It has a population of over 2000 people. It is the home of the North Eastern Comprehensive School better known as the NECS after the closing of the St. Andrews School in 2006.

Churches
 Catholic
 Seventh-Day Adventisy
 Pentecostal
 Baptist
 Seventh Day Church Of God
 Methodist
 Christian Union Mission

Amenities and attractions
 Lakwa Waterfall
 Randy's Restaurant
 Jan's Ideal Spot
 Little's Green Bar
 Caribbean Flavor Cuisine
 The Happy Box HQ
 Right now Shopping and bar

References

Populated places in Dominica
Saint Andrew Parish, Dominica